Hulluch is a commune in the Pas-de-Calais department in the Hauts-de-France region of France.

Geography

History
The chapter of Lens mentions Huluce in 1070 in a charter of Eustache de Boulogne.
St Vaast called it Huluz in 1098, by 1136 it was written Hulut and Hullut 1180.
in 1202 Huluch and Huluc. In 1303, Hulus on a seal affixed to a document and finally Hulluch from 1388, (confirmed again in 1429 by archives of Artois. It is pronounced Ooloo, as the final ch is not pronounced. 
The town already existed in the Gallo-Roman era. Some pottery from this period has been found while digging the basement of a house near the old Roman road. 
Originally inhabited by the Morins, the enemy of Julius Caesar, it was occupied by the Franks well before the 10th century. The village was chosen as a Christian mission during the 4th and 5th centuries.  
An early seigneur built a simple castle with a donjon and outbuildings surrounded by fences and ditches. Around the year 1300, it is surrounded by stone walls, battlements, towers and a drawbridge. This medieval castle was burned, along with the village, by the Flemish in 1303, then bombarded by the Spanish. The succession of battles and invasions led to its demise, unable to withstand the tests of time andwars.
Rebuilt as a chateau by Baron de Bertoult, during the reign of Louis XIV, the chateau was richly decorated and surrounded by a beautiful park.
Unfortunately, the chateau was blown up by the Germans at the outset of World War I, but afterwards replaced by a residential district, called "Clos du Chateau" to perpetuate the memory of the chateau. 
Hulluch was on a part of the Nord-Pas-de-Calais coal seam and coalmining began here in 1902 and stopped in 1978. The slag heaps from mining are now used to produce building materials.  
Hulluch has suffered two world wars and has few ancient monuments. One can find some old buildings representing the style of the region, with bricks and clay tiles and sloping roofs. There are some farms that escaped the destruction. Some bunkers remain in peoples’ gardens, remnants of World War I.  The German gas attack at Hulluch was among the most concentrated gas attacks of the war.

Population

Places of interest
 The church of St.Laurent, rebuilt, as was most of the village, after the First World War.
 The Commonwealth War Graves Commission cemetery.

See also
Communes of the Pas-de-Calais department

References

External links

 The CWGC ST.Mary's ADS cemetery
 The website of the Communaupole de Lens-Liévin 

Communes of Pas-de-Calais
Artois